Samuel Yaw Adusei is a Ghanaian politician and the  former deputy Ashanti Regional Minister of Ghana. and former deputy minister of works and housing  of Ghana.

References

Living people
National Democratic Congress (Ghana) politicians
Year of birth missing (living people)